The 2020 Supercupa României was the 22nd edition of the Supercupa României, an annual football super cup contested by the winners of the previous season's Liga I and Cupa României competitions. Because of the COVID-19 pandemic, the match was postponed until 15 April 2021.

The game featured CFR Cluj and FCSB, and the Ilie Oană Stadium in Ploiești hosted the competition for a second consecutive year. CFR Cluj claimed its fourth trophy after a 4–1 victory at the penalty shoot-out.

Teams

Venue
On 18 March 2021, Romanian Football Federation president Răzvan Burleanu announced that the match would be played on 15 April, at the Ilie Oană Stadium in Ploiești.

Match

Details

Statistics

Post-match
Edward Iordănescu claimed his second trophy as a manager—His first was also the Supercupa României, which he won during his first spell at CFR Cluj in 2019.

FCSB goalkeeper Andrei Vlad was named player of the match, on the eve of his 22nd birthday.

Notes

References

External links
Romania - List of Super Cup Finals, RSSSF.com

2020–21 in Romanian football
Supercupa României
CFR Cluj matches
FC Steaua București matches